The Völkischer Beobachter ("Völkisch Observer") was the newspaper of the Nazi Party (NSDAP) from 25 December 1920. It first appeared weekly, then daily from 8 February 1923. For twenty-four years it formed part of the official public face of the Nazi Party until its last edition at the end of April 1945. The paper was banned and ceased publication between November 1923, after Adolf Hitler's arrest for leading the unsuccessful Beer Hall Putsch in Munich, and February 1925, the approximate date of the relaunching of the Party.

History
The "fighting paper of the National Socialist movement of Greater Germany", or "Kampfblatt der nationalsozialistischen Bewegung Großdeutschlands" as it called itself, had its origin as the Münchener Beobachter, or "Munich Observer", an anti-Semitic semi-weekly scandal-oriented paper which in 1918 was acquired by the Thule Society and, in August 1919, was renamed Völkischer Beobachter (see Völkisch and Völkisch movement).

By December 1920, the paper was heavily in debt. The Thule Society was thus receptive to an offer to sell the paper to the Nazis for 60,000 Papiermark. Major Ernst Röhm, who was an early member of the German Workers' Party, forerunner of the Nazi Party, and Dietrich Eckart, one of Hitler's earliest mentors, persuaded Röhm’s commanding officer, Major General Franz Ritter von Epp, to provide the money from German Army funds for the paper to be purchased.  The loan was secured with Eckart's house and possessions as collateral, and Dr. Gottfried Grandel, an Augsburg chemist and factory owner, who was Eckart's friend and a funder of the Party, as guarantor. After the Nazis acquired the paper, Eckart was its first editor.  It was the party's primary official organ.

In 1921, Adolf Hitler, who had taken full control of the NSDAP earlier that year, acquired all shares in the company, making him the sole owner of the publication.

During the Nazi rise to power, the newspaper reported general news but also party activities, presenting them as almost constant successes. Guidelines for propagandists urged that all posters, insofar as the police allowed, contain propaganda for it, and all meetings should be announced in it, although reports should be sent to the Propaganda Department, which would then forward corrected versions to the paper. Posters did indeed urge reading it. When Hitler was banned from public speaking, it was the main vehicle to propagate his views.

Joseph Goebbels published articles in the Völkischer Beobachter to attack the United States for criticizing anti-Jewish measures, and to describe Russia.

The final issues of the paper from both April and May 1945 were not distributed.

Post-war 
According to top Soviet diplomat Vladimir Semyonov, Stalin suggested that the National Democratic Party of Germany (a satellite party created in East Germany to attract former Nazi supporters) resume publications of the Völkischer Beobachter: German Communists and some Soviet officials were appalled by Stalin's ideas and the proposal was ultimately not adopted.

Circulation
The circulation of the paper was initially about 8,000, but it increased to 25,000 in autumn 1923 due to strong demand during the occupation of the Ruhr. In that year Hitler replaced Eckart as editor with Alfred Rosenberg, because Eckart's alcoholism had begun to get in the way of running the paper. Hitler softened the blow by making it clear that he still regarded Eckart highly. "His accomplishments are everlasting!" Hitler said, he just was not constitutionally able to run a big business like a daily newspaper. "I would not be able to do it, either," according to Hitler, "I have been fortunate that I got a few people who know how to do it. ... It would be as if I tried to run a farm! I wouldn't be able to do it." 

Publication of the paper ceased on the prohibition of the Party after the failed Beer Hall Putsch of 9 November 1923, but it resumed on the party's refoundation on 26 February 1925. The circulation rose along with the success of the Nazi movement, reaching more than 120,000 in 1931, 1.2 million in 1941, and 1.7 million by 1944.

See also
Other newspapers of Nazi Germany:
Der Angriff ("The Attack"), Josef Goebbels' Berlin-based newspaper
Berliner Arbeiterzeitung ("Berlin Workers Newspaper"), Gregor and Otto Strasser's newspaper, representing the Strasserite wing of the Nazi Party
Illustrierter Beobachter ("Illustrated Observer"), illustrated companion to the Völkischer Beobachter
Panzerbär ("The Panzer Bear"), a tabloid Nazi newspaper intended for the troops defending Berlin from the Red Army
Das Reich, a weekly newspaper founded by Goebbels
Das Schwarze Korps ("The Black Corps"), the official newspaper of Heinrich Himmler's Schutzstaffel (SS)
Der Stürmer ("The Stormer"), Julius Streicher's Nuremberg-based virulently antisemitic and frequently semi-pornographic newspaper

References
Notes

Bibliography
 
 
 
 

Nazi newspapers
Publications established in 1918
Publications disestablished in 1945
History of Munich
Newspapers published in Munich
Defunct newspapers published in Germany
Propaganda newspapers and magazines